Scotsbrig is a farm near Ecclefechan, Dumfries and Galloway, Scotland, and a Category B listed building. Thomas Carlyle lived there with his family in the summer of 1826 before moving to 21 Comely Bank, Edinburgh. Scotsbrig remained a residence of the Carlyle family for decades. The farmhouse underwent numerous additions and renovations in the eighteenth and nineteenth centuries.

Carlyle recorded his first impressions in a letter to his brother John:The house is in bad order; but we hope to have it soon repaired; and for farming purposes, it is an excellent "shell of a house." Then we have a linn [waterfall] with crags and bushes, and a 'fairy knowe [knoll]' tho' no fairies that I have seen yet; and, cries our Mother, abundance of grand thready peats, and water from the brook, and no reek and no Honour to pester us! To say nothing, cries our father, of the eighten yeacre [acre] of the best barley in the country; and bog-hay, adds Alick, to fatten scores of young beasts!
In fact making all allowance for newfangledness, it is a much better place, so far as I can judge, than any our people have yet been in; and among far better and kindlier sort of people. I believe of a truth they will find themselves much obliged to his Honour for persecuting them away. Long life to his Honour! I myself like the place considerably better, tho' I have slept but ill yet, and am billus enough. But I have mounted your old straw-hat again; and fairly betaken me to work; and should, as we say Aberdeen-awa, "be bauld to compleen."

Notes

References

External links 

 Historic Environment Scotland Listing

Buildings and structures in Dumfries and Galloway
Thomas Carlyle
Category B listed buildings in Dumfries and Galloway